Lickety Split is the fourth studio album by American soul band Robert Randolph and the Family Band. It was released on July 16, 2013, under Blue Note Records.

Track listing

Personnel

Album line-up
 Robert Randolph – pedal steel guitar, guitar, vocals
 Marcus Randolph – drums
 Danyel Morgan – bass, vocals
 Brett Haas – vocals
 Lenesha Randolph – vocals

Guest appearances
 Eric Krasno – guitar ("Good Lovin'")
 Dwan Hill – organ ("Good Lovin'")
 Bekka Bramlett – backing vocals ("Born Again")
 Jason Crosby – keyboards ("Get Ready," "Lickety Split")
 Carlos Santana – guitar ("Brand New Wayo," "Blacky Joe")
 Trombone Shorty – trombone ("Take the Party")
 Adam Smirnoff – guitar ("Lickety Split")
 Tommy Sims – producer, bass, piano & guitar (Born Again, New Orleans, Brand New Wayo, Blackie Joe & Welcome Home)

References

2013 albums
Robert Randolph and the Family Band albums
Blue Note Records albums